Mark Izrailevich Rudinstein  (7 April 1946 – 5 December 2021) was a Russian actor, director, film producer and television presenter. He was the founder and producer of the international film festival Kinotavr, and the organizer of the first rock festival in the USSR, which took place on the "Green Stage" in Podolsk near Moscow in September 1987.

Biography
Rudinstein studied at Russian Institute of Theatre Arts and the Boris Shchukin Theatre Institute. After he worked as an administrator of the directorate of the "Circus on the Stage", then was the director of variety programs at Rosconcert. In the period from 1980 to 1983 Mark was the director of music band VIA Plamya, in the period from 1982 to 1983 he was the director and organizer of the concerts of VIA "Hello, Song!". He was also the organizer of the concerts of the Mashina Vremeni. 

On 17 November, Rudinstein was hospitalized with a heart attack. He was later put into an artificial coma and was connected to a ventilator. Died on 5 December 2021 at the age of 76 in Moscow in a hospital on Taganka.

In 2003 he was awarded the title of Honored Worker of Culture of the Russian Federation.

Filmography

As an actor
Come Look at Me (2001) as a Man with champagne
Moscow Saga (2004) as Lvov
It Doesn't Hurt Me (2006) as Zilberman
Kitchen (2015) as David Mikhailovich

As a producer
The Suicide (1990)
Dogs' Feast (1990)
Cynics (1991)

References

External links

1946 births
2021 deaths
Soviet male film actors
Russian male film actors
Russian film producers
Russian television presenters
Soviet Jews
Russian Jews
Actors from Odesa
Film people from Odesa
Odesa Jews